The Women's 200 metres competition at the 2012 Summer Olympics in London, United Kingdom. The event was held at the Olympic Stadium on 6–8 August.

The times in the three semi-finals were very close, but while Allyson Felix appeared to put a minimum of effort to hold off Murielle Ahouré in heat two, in heat one Veronica Campbell-Brown dipped at the finish to edge Carmelita Jeter and in heat three Sanya Richards-Ross raced Shelly-Ann Fraser-Pryce to the line.  Semoy Hackett set the Trinidad and Tobago national record as the first time qualifier, Myriam Soumaré only one hundredth behind as the other time qualifier in 22.56.

In the final Felix took lead through the turn and extended it to the finish. Campbell-Brown was second coming into the straight but was overtaken by Fraser-Pryce and Jeter who took the silver and bronze respectively.

Competition format

The Women's 200m competition consisted of heats (Round 1), semifinals and a Final. The fastest competitors from each race in the heats  qualified for the semifinals along with the fastest overall competitors not already qualified that were required to fill the available spaces in the semifinals.  A total of eight competitors qualified for the Final from the semifinals.

Records
, the existing World and Olympic records were as follows.

Schedule

All times are British Summer Time (UTC+1)

Results

Round 1

Qual. rule: first 3 of each heat (Q) plus the 6 fastest times (q) qualified.

Heat 1
Wind:Heat 1: +0.5 m/s

Heat 2
Wind:Heat 2: +1.2 m/s

Heat 3
Wind:Heat 3: +0.7 m/s

Heat 4
Wind:Heat 4: +0.3 m/s

Heat 5
Wind:Heat 5: +1.3 m/s

Heat 6
Wind:Heat 6: +0.8 m/s

Semi-final

Qual. rule: first 2 of each heat (Q) plus the 2 fastest times (q) qualified.

Heat 1
Wind:Heat 1: +1.0 m/s

Heat 2
Wind:Heat 2: +1.0 m/s

Heat 3
Wind:Heat 3: +0.8 m/s

Final
Wind: -0.2 m/s

References

Athletics at the 2012 Summer Olympics
200 metres at the Olympics
2012 in women's athletics
Women's events at the 2012 Summer Olympics